The Methodist Episcopal Parsonage (also known as the Marquez Residence) is a historic church parsonage at 202 Fourth Street in Dayton, Oregon.

It was built in 1868 and added to the National Register of Historic Places in 1987.

References

Methodist churches in Oregon
National Register of Historic Places in Yamhill County, Oregon
Churches completed in 1868
Buildings and structures in Dayton, Oregon
Properties of religious function on the National Register of Historic Places in Oregon
1868 establishments in Oregon
Clergy houses in the United States
Houses in Yamhill County, Oregon